Ali Nikzad (born 1961) is an Iranian conservative politician and academic and a former cabinet minister.

Early life and education
Nikzad was born in 1961. He holds a bachelor's degree in urban development from the University of Elm-va-san'at (Science and Industry). Then he received his master's degree in public management from Industrial Management University. Akbar Nikzad his brother is an Iranian politician and the former Governor of Ardabil Province.

Career
Nikzad was appointed governor of Ardabil Province in 2005. He then was the director of the municipalities organization at the ministry of interior until 2009. He served as the minister of transportation and housing from August 2009 to June 2011. He was also acting minister of roads and transportation from February to June 2011. As minister of housing, he replaced Mohammad Saeedikia after President Mahmoud Ahmadinejad was reelected.

On 7 February 2011, Nikzad was appointed by Ahmadinejad as acting minister of roads and transportation to succeed former dismissed Minister Hamid Behbahani. Nikzad was appointed minister of infrastructural affairs in May 2011 when the ministry was created, combining the two ministries of housing and urban development and road and transportation. At the end of 2012, he was also appointed acting minister of communications and information technology. President Ahmedinejad proposed him as minister for the post in January 2013. However, he was not approved by the Majlis.

He announced his candidacy for the 2013 presidential election. However, he later declined his candidacy. In June 2013, Nikzad was nominated as a candidate for Tehran mayor. The "Viva Spring" group consisting of Ahmedinejad's allies could not win the local elections that was also held on 14 June 2013 as the presidential election. Therefore, Nikzad's election as Tehran mayor became unlikely. In 2017 election, he was appointed as campaign chairman of presidential candidate Ebrahim Raisi.

References

1961 births
Living people
People from Ardabil
Government ministers of Iran
Iran University of Science and Technology alumni
Governors of Ardabil Province
Iranian campaign managers